Orthops kalmii is a species of plant bugs belonging to the family Miridae, subfamily Mirinae, that can be found everywhere in Europe but is absent on such islands as Azores, the Canary Islands, Faroe Islands, Iceland and Malta. then east through the Palearctic to Siberia. Both nymphs and adults feed on Apiaceae without preference. The name honours Finnish naturalist Pehr Kalm.

References

Bugs described in 1758
Taxa named by Carl Linnaeus
Hemiptera of Europe
Mirini